Mast Tawakali / Mast Taukali 1825-1892 ( Balochi: مست توکلی ) was a 19th century great Sufi poet of Balochi. He belonged to Loharani (Sherani) a branch of Marri tribe. It is believed that there is no piece of poetry of him that does not mention Samoo. Samoo's love was the source and pathway for Mast to get closer to God and purify his soul. The Balochistani Sufi poet Mast Tawakali was devoted to the underprivileged and occasionally stood with them in opposition to the oppressive feudal system.

When the sardars of Balochistan bowed to their British overlords, Tawakali, a contemporary of Khwaja Farid and Mian Muhammad Bakhsh, penned resistance poetry against the colonialists, according to Fakhar Zaman at the Mast Tawakali conference on Tuesday.

The World Punjabi Congress, International Writers Forum, Idaara Fikr-o-Khiyal, Pakistan Academy of Letters, and (WPC).

Tawakali's poetry, according to WPC Chairman Zaman, delivered a message of love, peace, tolerance, and fraternity, and it became so well-known that wherever he went, crowds gathered to catch a look of him.

Early life 
He was born in 1825 in Mank Band ,near from Kahan, District Kohlu Balochistan. His father Lal Khan,named him Sohrab.One stromy night he was travelling with his closer friend,however,caught by a storm and stayed in a nearby the tent,The tent in which he stayed belonged to lady named Samoo.He saw Samoo's first time in the lightening of the sky when she became to fix the tent.He fell in love with her first at sight.As the saying goes,the first sight of love is the last of wisdom. After that night he spent his entire life like a vagabond and known as Mast Tawakali means Nobody cares.

Later years and death 

It is said that at the age of 28 Mast Tawakali / Tauakli  fell in love with a lady called Samoo. He left every thing for his love and started poetry.This love of humen being ascends to God, thus he went from virtual love  to spiritual love. Mast Tawakali is the greatest Sufi poet of Balochi language and his poetry is closely attached to the suffering of common men. his poetry carried a message of peace ,love, tolerance and brotherhood.Mast Tawakali lived his whole life in search of truth,beauty and love. He was not only an eminent poet of Balochi but also a great Sufi of the era. As Sufis believe that by purifying their hearts they get close to God.For him,Samoo's love was the pathway to get there extreme.Sufis say that they see the divine presence in everything. Mast Taukali found it in Samoo.He says in a stanza:

نندون کاہان آ بیثغوں کوہانی مری

وا رضا بیثو ،بہانغے سمو اے کثئی

" Nindo;n Kahan a Bisagho'n Kohaani Marri; Wa Raza Beeso Bahanaghe Samoo e Kuth ey" ( I am an ordinary Marri of Kahan, not speak of my status, It was God and His acceptance I earned, Samoo was a mere means). He died at the age of 67, some 27 years after Samoo's death.

Shrine 
He died in 1892 at Pazza , Kohlu. He was buried in Mast Maidan Gari, District Kohlu ,Balochistan. There is Tomb of Mast Tawakali as you enter the shrine. A mosque has also built on the compound.

References 

Baloch poets
19th-century poets
Sufi poets
1825 births
1892 deaths